RSPP may refer to:

 Russian Union of Industrialists and Entrepreneurs
 Royal Society of Portrait Painters
 Radio Spectrum Policy Programme